Víctor Haroldo Púa Sosa (born 31 May 1956 in Paso de los Toros) is a Uruguayan former football player and currently a football manager.

Career
He coached the Uruguay U-20 national team, finishing runner-up in the 1997 FIFA World Youth Championship.

He was appointed to coach the Uruguay national team in the 1999 Copa América, earning second place honors. In 2001, he was chosen to replace Daniel Passarella, qualifying for the 2002 FIFA World Cup after finishing 5th in the South American zone and winning a playoff against Australia. Uruguay was drawn into group A alongside world champions France, Denmark and eventual tournament revelation Senegal. After a defeat to Denmark and a 0–0 draw with France, Uruguay had to beat Senegal to make it to the next round. Despite coming back from a 0–3 at half time, Richard Morales narrowly missed a fourth goal with the goalkeeper down, which left Uruguay in 3rd place and out of the next round.

In 2004, he coached Argentine side Rosario Central but resigned after only 2 matches, because of differences with the board and a defeat to Newell's Old Boys in the local derby.

Clubs as player
 Liverpool Montevideo
 River Plate Montevideo
 Defensor Sporting Club
 Olimpia Asunción
 Deportivo Mandiyú
 Rampla Juniors
 Cerrito

Teams as coach
 River Plate Montevideo
 Uruguay
 Rosario Central
 Peñarol youths general manager 2007–2009, manager 2009

Family
His son is the midfielder Federico Púa, currently playing in Chile.

References

1956 births
Living people
People from Paso de los Toros
Uruguayan footballers
Liverpool F.C. (Montevideo) players
Club Atlético River Plate (Montevideo) players
River Plate Montevideo managers
Defensor Sporting players
Rampla Juniors players
Club Olimpia footballers
C.A. Bella Vista players
Expatriate footballers in Argentina
Expatriate footballers in Paraguay
Uruguayan football managers
Peñarol managers
Rosario Central managers
Expatriate football managers in Argentina
Uruguay national football team managers
1997 FIFA Confederations Cup managers
1999 Copa América managers
2001 Copa América managers
2002 FIFA World Cup managers
Association football defenders
Pan American Games gold medalists for Uruguay
Medalists at the 1983 Pan American Games
Footballers at the 1983 Pan American Games
Pan American Games medalists in football